The N-2 is an Armenian multiple rocket launcher designed and produced by the Scientific Production Association Garni-Ler starting no later than 2011. Armenia has not released much information regarding the rocket system, however it is apparent that the N-2 is being mass-produced, and is in active use by the Armenian Armed Forces, and likely the Nagorno-Karabakh Defense Army. The system was developed onto the GAZ-3308, a Russian military truck. The launcher is mainly used with Armenian TB-1 thermobaric missiles and RPG-7 grenades, but is designed to be compatible with a wide variety of ammunition from many different countries. The launcher, holding up to 12 rockets, is fired using a remote electrical panel, and can be fired in single shots or in a salvo for up to 10 seconds.

References

Weapons of Armenia
Armenian inventions
Rocket launchers